Patrik Isaksson may refer to:

 Patrik Isaksson (singer) (born 1972), Swedish singer and songwriter
 Patrik Isaksson (album), 2006
 Patrik Isaksson (swimmer) (born 1973), breaststroke swimmer from Sweden